Tommot Urban Settlement is a municipal formation (an urban settlement) in Aldansky Municipal District of the Sakha Republic, Russia, one of the four urban settlements in the district. Its territory comprises the territories of two administrative divisions of Aldansky District—the Town of Tommot (which, in addition to Tommot, contains three rural localities) and the Settlement of Bezymyanny.

References

Notes

Sources

Urban settlements of Russia
Geography of the Sakha Republic